Hubert Laurence Higgs (23 November 1911 – 4 January 1992) was the seventh Anglican Bishop of Hull in the modern era (from 1965 until 1977).

Life
Higgs was educated at University College School and Christ's College, Cambridge. His first post after ordination was as a curate at Holy Trinity, Richmond. He was then Vicar of Holy Trinity, Aldershot, Rural Dean of Woking  and finally Archdeacon of Bradford before elevation to the episcopate as a suffragan to the Archbishop of York.

References

1911 births
1992 deaths
People educated at University College School
Alumni of Christ's College, Cambridge
Archdeacons of Bradford
Bishops of Hull
20th-century Church of England bishops